Brett Carter may refer to:

Brett A. Carter (entrepreneur and political advisor), Canadian entrepreneur and political advisor 
Brett Carter (politician), American politician
Brett Carter (rugby league), British rugby league footballer